{{Speciesbox
| name = Brown-headed nuthatch
| image = Brown-headed Nuthatch-27527-4c.jpg
| image_caption = In North Carolina, US
| status = LC
| status_system = IUCN3.1
| status_ref = 
| taxon = Sitta pusilla
| authority = Latham, 1790
| subdivision_ranks = Subspecies
| subdivision = S. p. canicepsS. p. pusillaS. p. insularis
| range_map = Brown-headed Nuthatch-rangemap.png
| range_map_caption = Range of S. pusilla}}

The brown-headed nuthatch (Sitta pusilla) is a small songbird endemic to pine forests throughout the Southeastern United States. Genetic analyses indicated low differentiation between northern and southern populations in Florida, but the study also found  lower genetic diversity among south Florida populations that may be a result of the increased habitat fragmentation that was documented. The Bahama nuthatch was formerly considered a subspecies (S. p. insularis), has since been reclassified as its own separate species. Two recent studies assessing vocalizations in Bahama and continental nuthatch populations found important differences.  One of the studies also demonstrated that  continental and Bahama populations did not respond aggressively to calls of the other population. This type of call-response study is often used to help define cryptic species.

The bird, like other nuthatches, possesses a sharp black nail-like beak, which it uses to pound open seeds. It is a frequent visitor to feeding stations and is highly fond of sunflower seeds and suet cakes. Bold and inquisitive, this bird is readily approachable by humans.

The bird is regularly observed using a small chips of bark, small twigs, and pine needles held in its beak as tools to dig for insects.  The nuthatch exhibits other curious behaviors such as cooperative groups where groups of 3–5 adults provide care at a single nest.  Recent genetic assessments suggest some of the putatively non-breeding adults associated with these groups may  actually breed with individuals in neighboring territories.  This nuthatch  also exhibits a wide range of other social behaviors that include social grooming and male-female duets similar to those observed for the pygmy nuthatch.

The brown-headed nuthatch has been found to prefer making their nests at the top of short snags.

Despite the other species' common name, the brown-headed nuthatch is about the same size as the pygmy nuthatch and the two species are the world's smallest nuthatches. This species sports a brown cap with narrow black eyeline and buff white cheeks, chin, and belly. Its wings are bluish-gray in color. A small white spot is found at the nape of the neck. The bird's call is a sharp whee-hyah sounding very similar to a "rubber duck" toy and particularly is loud for a bird its size. They also make softer "pit pit pit"'' calls while in flight as well as other squeaking noises. If heard or seen well, this species is virtually unmistakable in the wild, since it overlaps only with the very differently marked and larger red-breasted and white-breasted nuthatches.

References

External links

 Brown-Headed Nuthatch - Sitta pusilla - USGS Patuxent Bird Identification InfoCenter
 Brown-headed Nuthatch Species Account – Cornell Lab of Ornithology
 
 Brown-headed Nuthatch Bird Sound at Florida Museum of Natural History
 

brown-headed nuthatch
Native birds of the Southeastern United States
Endemic birds of the Eastern United States
Tool-using animals
brown-headed nuthatch
brown-headed nuthatch